Louis-Joseph Chevrolet (December 25, 1878 – June 6, 1941) was a Swiss-American race car driver, mechanic and entrepreneur who co-founded the Chevrolet Motor Car Company in 1911.

Early life

Louis-Joseph Chevrolet was born on December 25, 1878, in La Chaux-de-Fonds, canton of Neuchâtel, a center of watchmaking in northwestern Switzerland. He was the second child of Joseph-Félicien Chevrolet, a watchmaker, and Marie-Anne Angéline Mahon. His family was originally from Bonfol, now in the canton of Jura.

In 1887, Chevrolet left Switzerland along with his father to settle in Beaune, France. There, as a young man, he developed his mechanical skills and interest in bicycle racing. During this period, Chevrolet invented a wine pump, which he built from a defective one-cylinder motor mounted on a three-wheeled bicycle.

Career

Early career

Chevrolet worked at the Roblin mechanics shop in Beaune from around 1889 to 1899. He then moved to Paris, where he worked at various mechanics shops, between 1899 and 1900, before emigrating to Montreal, Quebec, Canada in 1900 to work as a mechanic. The following year, he moved to New York City, where he worked briefly for a fellow Swiss immigrant's engineering company, then moved to the Brooklyn operations of the French car manufacturer de Dion-Bouton.

In 1905, Chevrolet won his first race in a FIAT. In 1907 he was hired by the Autocar Company in Philadelphia, probably for a secret project to develop a revolutionary front-wheel-drive racing car.

His racing career continued as he drove for Buick, becoming a friend and associate of Buick owner William C. Durant, founder of General Motors. He raced at the Giants Despair Hillclimb in 1909. With little in the way of formal education, Chevrolet learned car design while working for Buick and started designing his own engine for a new car in 1909. He built an overhead valve six-cylinder engine in his own machine shop on Grand River Boulevard in Detroit, Michigan. He is credited as one of three co-designers of the 1910 Buick 60 Special, also known as the "Buick Bug".

Chevrolet car company

On November 3, 1911, Chevrolet co-founded the Chevrolet Motor Car Company with his brother Arthur Chevrolet, William C. Durant, and investment partners William Little (maker of the Little automobile) and Dr. Edwin R. Campbell, son-in-law of Durant and friend of Samuel McLaughlin of the McLaughlin Car Company of Canada Ltd. The company was established in Detroit. One story tells the choosing of the company's logo as a modified Swiss cross, to honor Chevrolet's homeland. 
Another story tells of the Chevrolet logo as a design taken from the wallpaper of a Paris hotel room where Louis once stayed.

Chevrolet had differences with Durant over the car's design, and in 1915 sold Durant his share in the company and started McLaughlin's Company in Canada building Chevrolets. By 1916 the trading of Chevrolet stock for GM Holding stock enabled Durant to repurchase a controlling stake in General Motors, and by 1917 the Chevrolet company that Louis had co-founded was merged as a company into General Motors after the outstanding Chevrolet stocks were purchased from McLaughlin in 1918. The McLaughlin Car Company then merged with his Chevrolet Motor Company of Canada Ltd. to become General Motors of Canada Ltd. in 1918, prior to the incorporation of the General Motors Corporation in the U.S. when General Motors Company of New Jersey dissolved.

Frontenac and American car companies

In 1916, Louis Chevrolet and his brothers founded the Frontenac Motor Corporation to make racing parts for Ford Model Ts.

Also in 1916, American Motors Corporation (unrelated to the later American Motors created by the 1954 merger of Nash-Kelvinator Corporation and Hudson Motor Car Company) was formed in Newark, New Jersey, with Louis Chevrolet as vice president and chief engineer. By 1918 it was producing cars in a plant at Plainfield, New Jersey. In 1923 it merged with the Bessemer Motor Truck Company of Pennsylvania into Bessemer-American Motors Corporation, which lasted less than a year before merging with the Winther and Northway companies into Amalgamated Motors. The latter company apparently ceased soon after.

Auto racing
By the mid-1910s, Louis Chevrolet had shifted into the car racing industry, partnering with Howard E. Blood of Allegan, Michigan, to create the Cornelian racing car, which he used to place 20th in the 1915 Indianapolis 500 automobile race. In 1916, he and his younger brothers Gaston and Arthur Chevrolet started Frontenac Motor Corporation, designing and producing a line of racing cars. They became well known for, among other things, their Fronty-Ford racers.

Louis drove in the Indianapolis 500 four times, with a best finish of 7th in 1919. Both Louis and Gaston competed successfully with racing Sunbeams achieving a number of third places in 1916. Arthur competed twice, and Gaston won the race in 1920 in one of their Frontenacs, going on to win the 1920 AAA National Championship. He also raced for the Buick racing team.

Later life

In 1927, Chevrolet launched the aircraft engine construction company Chevrolair, which failed three years later as a result of the Great Depression. He returned to Chevrolet to work as simple mechanic in the Detroit factories.

Chevrolet died on June 6, 1941, in Detroit due to a heart attack. He had been plagued with atherosclerosis which had previously led to a leg amputation. He is buried in the Holy Cross and Saint Joseph Cemetery in Indianapolis, Indiana.

Personal life
In 1905, Chevrolet married Suzanne Treyvoux, daughter of Louis Treyvoux and Marie Burlat. The couple had two sons and a daughter, Clara.

He became an American citizen in 1915.

Louis Chevrolet Memorial

The Indianapolis Motor Speedway Museum in Speedway, Indiana, features a memorial at the entrance to the building dedicated to the accomplishments of Louis Chevrolet. The memorial, designed by Fred Wellman and sculpted by Adolph Wolter, was created during 1968–1970 and installed in the spring of 1975. The centerpiece of the memorial is a bronze bust of Chevrolet wearing a racing cap and goggles; it rests on a marble and granite square base.

Indy 500 results

Awards
Chevrolet was inducted into the following halls of fame:

Automotive Hall of Fame (1969)

National Sprint Car Hall of Fame (1990)
International Motorsports Hall of Fame (1992)
Motorsports Hall of Fame of America (1995)

References

Clymer, Floyd. Treasury of Early American Automobiles, 1877–1925. New York: Bonanza Books, 1950.

 Sinzig, Martin. Louis Chevrolet, der Mann, der dem Chevy seinen Namen gab". Frauenfeld. Verlag Huber, 2011.

External links

 
 Louis Chevrolet at VanderbiltCupRaces.com
 
 Louis Chevrolet at ChevroletBrothers.com

1878 births
1941 deaths
People from La Chaux-de-Fonds
Swiss racing drivers
Swiss emigrants to the United States
American racing drivers
Indianapolis 500 drivers
American founders of automobile manufacturers
American automotive pioneers
International Motorsports Hall of Fame inductees
National Sprint Car Hall of Fame inductees
AAA Championship Car drivers
Burials at Holy Cross and Saint Joseph Cemetery
Automotive businesspeople
Chevrolet
General Motors people
Swiss businesspeople